Mardela Middle and High School (MMHS) is a seven-year public middle school & high school in Mardela Springs, Wicomico County, Maryland, United States. It is the only combination middle and high school in Wicomico County Public Schools.

Overview
The school is located on the Eastern Shore of Maryland in the town of Mardela Springs in Wicomico County. The school is on Maryland Route 54, east of Maryland Route 313 and just north of U.S. 50. Mardela Springs is between the Eastern Shore towns of Vienna and Hebron.

The current school building was constructed between the years of 1978 and 1980, on the same site as the previous school which was built in 1937.

Sports
Athletic programs offered at the school include the following:

 Fall: cheerleading, cross country, golf, boys' soccer, girls' soccer, and tennis.
 Winter: boys' basketball, girls' basketball, cheerleading, indoor track & field, strength & conditioning, and wrestling.
 Spring: baseball and softball.

State Champions

1982 - Girls' Field Hockey 
1980 - Softball 
1978 - Girls' Field Hockey

State Finalist

1981 - Softball
1979 - Girls' Field Hockey
1978 - Girls' Basketball 
1978 - Softball

State Semi-Finalist

2013 - Boys' Soccer
2007-2011 - Girls' Soccer 
2002 - Girls' Basketball
1997 - Girls' Basketball
1994 - Softball
1991 - Softball
1990 - Girls' Basketball
1989 - Softball
1988 - Girls' Basketball
1987 - Softball
1977 - Girls' Basketball
1976 - Softball
1973 - Boys' Soccer 
1955 - Boys' Basketball 
1950 - Boys' Basketball

Photo gallery

See also
Wicomico County Public Schools
List of high schools in Maryland

References and notes

External links

Mardela Middle & High School website
Map of School from Google Maps

Public high schools in Maryland
Schools in Wicomico County, Maryland
Public middle schools in Maryland